Midsomer may refer to–
 Midsomer Norton, a town in England
 Midsomer, a fictional county in England that is the setting of the TV series  Midsomer Murders